Chbar Mon Municipality is a municipality (krong) located in Kampong Speu province in central Cambodia. The provincial capital Chbar Mon town is located within the municipality.

Etymology

Chbar Mon means "mulberry garden" in Khmer. It composes of Chbar meaning "garden", and mon meaning "mulberry".

Administration
Chbar Mon Municipality is subdivided into 5 quarters (sangkats).

References

Districts of Kampong Speu province